Charles Adams Claverie (August 28, 1949 – October 7, 2005), known by stage names Charlie Hamburger, Charlie Kennedy and Charles Rocket, was an American actor, comedian, musician, and television news reporter. He was a cast member on Saturday Night Live, played the villain Nicholas Andre in the film Dumb and Dumber, and played Dave Dennison in Disney's Hocus Pocus.

Early life
Rocket was born in Bangor, Maine, the son of Mary Aurelia ( Fogler) and Sumner Abbott "Ham" Claverie. He attended the Rhode Island School of Design (RISD) in the late 1960s and was part of the Rhode Island underground culture scene in the 1970s that also included Talking Heads frontman David Byrne and film director Gus Van Sant.

Career
Rocket made several short films and fronted his band, the Fabulous Motels, on accordion (which he used in an SNL sketch about a crazed criminal who uses an accordion to kill his dates and is killed himself by a bagpipe band). He was then a news anchor at WPRI-TV in Providence, Rhode Island and at KOAA-TV in Pueblo, Colorado under his own name, and WTVF Nashville under the name Charles Kennedy. He made his network debut on Saturday Night Live in 1980, using the name Charles Rocket.

Saturday Night Live
Rocket was cast for the 1980–81 season, which followed the departure of the remaining members of the show's original cast and executive producer Lorne Michaels. Singled out by new executive producer Jean Doumanian, he was promoted as a cross between Bill Murray and Chevy Chase.  Rocket was tapped to anchor Weekend Update, and was featured in more sketches than any other male cast member that season with the exception of Joe Piscopo.

Rocket portrayed recurring character Phil Lively, a game show host who took his larger-than-life persona home and treated life as if it were a game show. His celebrity impersonations on SNL included Ronald Reagan, David Rockefeller, Prince Charles, and Marlin Perkins.  He also hosted "The Rocket Report”, a series of filmed segments where he posed as a roving reporter around New York, which reviewers in later years mentioned as one of the few consistently strong parts of Doumanian's shows.

Dismissal
The Saturday Night Live episode of February 21, 1981, hosted by Dallas star Charlene Tilton, featured a parody of the famed "Who shot J.R.?" story arc from the popular nighttime soap. During the show a plot line had Rocket and Tilton flirting while other cast members expressed jealousy, leading to Rocket being shot in the chest by a sniper in the middle of a sketch. In the show's closing moments, as cast members gathered with the host to say good night, Tilton asked Rocket how he felt about being shot. In character, Rocket replied "Oh man, it's the first time I've ever been shot in my life. I'd like to know who fuckin' did it."   

Due partially to the violation of broadcast standards, along with negative press regarding the new cast and declining ratings for both the series and the network in general, NBC replaced Doumanian with Dick Ebersol after one further episode. Ebersol, who placed the show on hiatus for a month to retool, dismissed Rocket, along with several of the writers and fellow cast members Gilbert Gottfried and Ann Risley, before the next episode. A writers' strike led to the suspension of the rest of the season, and when the show returned in October 1981, Joe Piscopo and Eddie Murphy were the only cast members who were held over from Doumanian's era. Saturday Night: A Backstage History of Saturday Night Live revealed that Rocket was particularly hostile toward Murphy and Piscopo, as Doumanian had set him, Denny Dillon, and Gail Matthius to be the show's biggest stars, only to have all three receive mixed-to-negative reviews about their performances and to have Murphy and Piscopo upstage them.

Post-SNL career
Rocket recovered from this early-career setback and worked steadily in film, with roles in such movies as Hocus Pocus, Earth Girls Are Easy, It's Pat, Steal Big Steal Little, How I Got into College, Dances with Wolves, and Dumb and Dumber, often playing comic foils.

On television, in addition to guest spots on several 1980s sitcoms, Rocket played antagonist network president Ned Grossberg on the cyberpunk series Max Headroom, Richard Addison (brother to Bruce Willis's David Addison) on the comedy-drama Moonlighting, and Adam, an angel of death, on Touched by an Angel.  He later guest starred in the T.V. series Wings as long time friend to Brian Hackett, Danny.  Rocket also appeared in a season six episode of 3rd Rock From The Sun as a physics professor, Grant.

In addition to his acting work, Rocket played accordion on the David Byrne-produced B-52's album Mesopotamia on the track "Loveland", and the album Amarcord Nino Rota on the track "La Dolce Vita Suite", produced by Saturday Night Live music coordinator Hal Willner.

He also provided the voice of Leo Lionheart Jr. in the "MGM Sing-Alongs" videos in 1996.

Personal life
Rocket married his college girlfriend, Beth Crellin, on board the battleship USS Massachusetts anchored in Fall River, Massachusetts, in 1972. Their son, Zane, was born in 1976.

Death
Rocket was found dead in a field on his Connecticut property on October 7, 2005, with his throat slit. He was 56 years old. Ten days later, the state medical examiner ruled the death as suicide. The police investigation determined that there was no criminal aspect to the case.

Filmography

 1984 The Outlaws as Stanley Flynn
 1985 Fraternity Vacation as 'Madman' Mac
 1986 Miracles as Michael
 1987 Down Twisted as Reno
 1988 Earth Girls Are Easy as Dr. Ted Gallagher
 1989 How I Got Into College as Leo Whitman
 1990 Honeymoon Academy as DeBains
 1990 Dances with Wolves as Lieutenant Elgin
 1991 Delirious as Ty Hedison
 1993 Brainsmasher... A Love Story as Detective Jones
 1993 Hocus Pocus as Dave
 1993 Short Cuts as Wally Littleton
 1994 It's Pat as Kyle Jacobsen
 1994 Wagons East as General Larchmont
 1994 Dumb and Dumber as Nicholas Andre
 1995 Steal Big Steal Little as Sheriff Otis
 1995 Charlie's Ghost Story as Van Leer
 1995 Tom and Huck as Judge Thatcher
 1997 Murder at 1600 as Jeffrey
 1997 Fathers' Day as Russ Trainor
 1997 The Killing Grounds as Mel Desordo
 1998 Dry Martini as Sam
 1999 Carlo's Wake as Derek Donovan
 2000 Titan A.E. as Firrikash / Slave Trader Guard (voice)
 2000 Tex, the Passive-Aggressive Gunslinger as Bart
 2002 New Suit as Del Strontium
 2002 Bleach (Short film) as Reverend Jim
 2003 Shade as Tony 'Tony D'
 2004 Yu-Gi-Oh! The Movie: Pyramid of Light as Narrator (final film role)
 2008 Fly Me to the Moon as Mission Control 1961 (posthumous release)

Television

 1980-1981 Saturday Night Live (Season 6; 12 episodes) as Various Roles / Weekend Update Anchor / Saturday Night Newsline Anchor
 1982 TV Party (1 episode)
 1983 I Do, I Don't (1 episode)
 1984 The Investigators as Truman Knuman, Anchorman
 1984 Hawaiian Heat (1 episode) as Donald
 1985 Steel Collar Man (1 episode) as D5B
 1985 Remington Steele (1 episode) as Peter Gillespie
 1985 California Girls (TV movie) as Barry
 1985 Hardcastle and McCormick (1 episode) as Bill Bauer
 1985-1989 Moonlighting (6 episodes) as Richard Addison
 1986 Miami Vice (1 episode) as Marty Worthington
 1987-1988 Max Headroom (4 episodes) as Grossberg
 1988-1989 Murphy's Law (Unknown episodes) as Victor Beaudine
 1990 thirtysomething (1 episode) as Ron DeLisle
 1990 Doctor Doctor (1 episode) as Charles
 1990 Murder, She Wrote (1 episode) as Lieutenant Stuyvesant
 1990-1992 Quantum Leap (2 episodes) as Commander Dirk Riker / Michael G. Blake
 1991 Parker Lewis Can't Lose (1 episode) as Sergeant Jake Melman
 1992 Tequila and Bonetti (11 episodes) as Captain Midian Knight
 1993 Flying Blind (5 episodes) as Dennis Lake
 1993 Wild Palms (3 episodes) as Stitch
 1994 Wings (1 episode) as Danny
 1994 Lois & Clark: The New Adventures of Superman (1 episode) as Ryan Wiley
 1994-2003 Touched by an Angel (10 episodes) as Adam
 1995-1996 The Home Court (20 episodes) as Judge Gil Fitzpatrick
 1996 The Adventures of Hyperman (1 episode) as The Oil Slick Monster
 1996 Picket Fences (1 episode) as Chuck Dante
 1996 The Pretender (1 episode) as Carl Bishop
 1997 Men in Black: The Series (1 episode)
 1997 Grace Under Fire (1 episode) as Davis
 1997-1998 The New Batman Adventures (3 episodes) as Security Guard / Rob the Mutant / Frederick Fournier /  Henchman / Guru / Fearless Man (voice)
 1998 Jenny (1 episode) as Grant
 1998 Cybill (2 episodes) as Charlie Addison
 1999 Tracey Takes On... (1 episode) as Chopper Tim
 1999 Superman: The Animated Series (1 episode) as Used Car Salesman (voice)
 1999 Star Trek: Voyager (episode, "The Disease") as Jippeq
 1999 The X-Files (episode, "Three of a Kind) as Grant Ellis
 1999 Batman Beyond (1 episode) as Donny's Dad (voice)
 2000 Normal, Ohio (7 episodes) as Danny
 2001 3rd Rock from the Sun (1 episode) as Gary
 2001 The Zeta Project (1 episode) as Edwards
 2002 Greg the Bunny (1 episode) as Don Dinkins
 2003 Static Shock (1 episode) as Crewcut
 2003 The King of Queens (1 episode) as Steve
 2004 Law & Order: Criminal Intent (1 episode) as Donny DePalma

Video Games 
 2002 Age of Mythology as Ajax
 2001 Star Wars: Starfighter as Nym
 2002 Star Wars: Jedi Starfighter as Nym

Music videos 
 1989 "Yer So Bad" by Tom Petty
 1991 "King of the Hill" by Roger McGuinn with Tom Petty
 1997 "Good Year" by The Refreshments

Notes

Bibliography
Hill, Doug and Weingrad, Jeff (1986). Saturday Night: A Backstage History of Saturday Night Live. New York, Beech Tree Books/William Morrow. .

External links

 
 
 
 Obituary for Charles Rocket Variety. October 10, 2005.
  Phillipe and Jorge, Providence Phoenix. October 14, 2005.
  Jim Emerson, RogerEbert.com. October 17, 2005.

1949 births
2005 deaths
20th-century American male actors
21st-century American male actors
Actors from Providence, Rhode Island
American sketch comedians
American male journalists
American male film actors
American male television actors
American male video game actors
American male voice actors
American television journalists
Male actors from Maine
People from Bangor, Maine
Rhode Island School of Design alumni
Suicides by sharp instrument in the United States
Suicides in Connecticut
Deaths from bleeding
20th-century American comedians
21st-century American comedians
2005 suicides